Rokytnice v Orlických horách is a town in Rychnov nad Kněžnou District in the Hradec Králové Region of the Czech Republic. It has about 2,000 inhabitants. The town centre is well preserved and is protected by law as an urban monument zone.

Administrative parts

The village of Nebeská Rybná is an administrative part of Rokytnice v Orlických horách.

Geography
It lies in the Orlické Mountains. The small river Rokytenka flows through the municipality.

History
The first written mention of Rokytnice v Orlických horách is from 1318. In 1548, a water fortress was built. From 1567, Rokytnice was owned by various German noble families and colonized by German people, especially craftsmen. From 1712 to 1938, the Jewish community was present. The Germans made up the majority of population until 1945, when they were expelled.

Transport
The railway Rokytnice v Orlických horách–Doudleby nad Orlicí of local importance starts here.

Sights

The most valuable building is the Rokytnice v Orlických horách Castle. It was built in 1600 during the rule of Kryštof Mauschwitz of Armenruh, who has demolished the old fortress and had built a late Renaissance castle.

The Church of All Saints was built in 1679–1684 on the site of a wooden church from the 14th century, which was destroyed by a fire in 1661.

Notable people
Else Kastner-Michalitschke (1868–1939), Austrian writer
Elfriede Kuzmany (1915–2006), Austrian actress

References

External links

Populated places in Rychnov nad Kněžnou District
Cities and towns in the Czech Republic